Road–rail tunnels are tunnels shared by road and rail lines, as an economy measure compared to constructing segregated tunnels. Road and rail may be provided with separate tubes.

China
Jiangyin Jingjiang Yangtze River Tunnel (under construction), S229 and Xicheng Intercity Rail Transit
Shanghai Yangtze River Parallel Tunnel, Shanghai Metro Chongming line and 4-lane road.
Wuhan Yangtze River road-railway Tunnel (Line 7 and Sanyang road-Qinyuan road), the first road-rail tunnel of Yangtze River built by tunnel-borning machine.

Denmark
Oresund Bridge (tunnel directly linked to a bridge)
 Fehmarn Belt Tunnel – construction began 2021

France
Montets tunnel, single tube shared by road and railway (used by road vehicles only when the pass road is closed because of snow)

Hong Kong
Eastern Harbour Crossing

Netherlands

Turkey
Great Istanbul Tunnel (proposed in 2015)

United States
Alaska
Anton Anderson Memorial Tunnel

Pennsylvania
Mount Washington Transit Tunnel

Washington
Downtown Seattle Transit Tunnel (until 2019)

See also 
 List of road–rail bridges

References 

Road-rail tunnels
Road-rail tunnels
Road-rail